Yahya Al Bishri (born 13 August 1962) is a Saudi fashion designer. He has designed garments for King Abdullah and royal families around the world such as Diana, Princess of Wales.

Early life and education
Yahya Al Bishri was born in Abha, where he received primary education before moving to Jeddah, to complete his study.
Attracted to art, fashion and design world which is full of creation and innovation. His hobby was developed to become a profession through academic study at the Milano School of Fashion and the Paris American Academy for art and fashion. Al Bishri, who in the late 1980s was one of the first Saudis to enter the world of fashion, was used to overcoming barriers.

His father, shocked and disappointed by his son's choice of profession, initially cut him off, hoping he would return to a more conventional line of work. So Al Bishri supported 2 1/2 years of fashion design studies in Italy and France, by writing and selling poems and freelancing for local newspapers. In 1988 Yahya Al Bishri graduated as a fashion designer.

Career
Al Bishri is credited with having taken the Saudi fashion industry to the next level, allowing Saudi Arabia’s name to shine in the fashion world with a unique fusion of traditional Saudi clothes with foreign traits.
Introducing new designs and fashion in a conservative Saudi society that is proud of its culture and heritage has been a difficult job for Al Bishri. 

Unlike other Saudi designers, who usually settle abroad in foreign countries, Al Bishri decided to remain in the Kingdom and make Saudi Arabia his primary target market.

References

Living people
1962 births
Saudi Arabian fashion designers